Loxostege commixtalis, the alfalfa webworm, is a species of moth in the family Crambidae. It was described by Francis Walker in 1866. It is found in Fennoscandia, Estonia and northern Russia. It is also found in North America, where it ranges from Nova Scotia and Newfoundland and Labrador west to the Yukon.

The forewings are extensively dusted with light bluish gray. The hindwings are gray. Adults are on wing from June to July in North America and from May to July in Europe.

The larvae feed on various succulent plants, including sugar beet and alfalfa. They web together the leaves of their host plant. The larvae are greenish or blackish.

References

Moths described in 1866
Moths of Europe
Moths of North America
Pyraustinae
Taxa named by Francis Walker (entomologist)